Kwak Hyok-ju (born 3 April 1984) is a North Korean boxer. He competed in the men's light flyweight event at the 2004 Summer Olympics.

References

1984 births
Living people
North Korean male boxers
Olympic boxers of North Korea
Boxers at the 2004 Summer Olympics
Place of birth missing (living people)
Boxers at the 2006 Asian Games
Asian Games competitors for North Korea
Light-flyweight boxers